Cigaritis menelas, the red-spot silverline, is a butterfly in the family Lycaenidae. The species was first described by Hamilton Herbert Druce in 1907. It is found in Ivory Coast, Ghana, southern Nigeria and western Cameroon. The habitat consists of forests.

References

External links
Die Gross-Schmetterlinge der Erde 13: Die Afrikanischen Tagfalter. Plate XIII 69 g

Butterflies described in 1907
Cigaritis